Whitley Gardens is a census-designated place in San Luis Obispo County, California. The 2010 United States census reported Whitley Gardens's population was 285.

Geography
According to the United States Census Bureau, the CDP covers an area of 1.4 square miles (3.6 km), 99.20% of it land and 0.80% of it water.

Demographics
The 2010 United States Census reported that Whitley Gardens had a population of 285. The racial makeup of Whitley Gardens was 260 (91.2%) White, 1 (0.4%) African American, 6 (2.1%) Native American, 1 (0.4%) Asian, 0 (0.0%) Pacific Islander, 13 (4.6%) from other races, and 4 (1.4%) from two or more races. Hispanic or Latino of any race were 43 persons (15.1%).

The Census reported that 285 people (100% of the population) lived in households, 0 (0%) lived in non-institutionalized group quarters, and 0 (0%) were institutionalized.

There were 110 households, out of which 30 (27.3%) had children under the age of 18 living in them, 61 (55.5%) were opposite-sex married couples living together, 13 (11.8%) had a female householder with no husband present, 3 (2.7%) had a male householder with no wife present.  There were 14 (12.7%) unmarried opposite-sex partnerships, and 1 (0.9%) same-sex married couples or partnerships. 23 households (20.9%) were made up of individuals, and 6 (5.5%) had someone living alone who was 65 years of age or older. The average household size was 2.59.  There were 77 families (70.0% of all households); the average family size was 3.00.

The population was spread out, with 57 people (20.0%) under the age of 18, 17 people (6.0%) aged 18 to 24, 68 people (23.9%) aged 25 to 44, 107 people (37.5%) aged 45 to 64, and 36 people (12.6%) who were 65 years of age or older.  The median age was 45.1 years. For every 100 females, there were 111.1 males.  For every 100 females age 18 and over, there were 115.1 males.

The homeowner vacancy rate was 0%; the rental vacancy rate was 6.3%.  170 people (59.6% of the population) lived in owner-occupied housing units and 115 people (40.4%) lived in rental housing units.

References

Census-designated places in San Luis Obispo County, California
Census-designated places in California